Javier Ortiz may refer to:

 Xavier Ortiz, Mexican actor and singer
 Javier Ortiz (outfielder) (born 1963), former American Major League Baseball player
 Javier Ortiz (pitcher) (born 1979), Colombian baseball pitcher